A reconnaissance satellite or intelligence satellite (commonly, although unofficially, referred to as a spy satellite) is an Earth observation satellite or communications satellite deployed for military or intelligence applications.

The first generation type (i.e., Corona and Zenit) took photographs, then ejected canisters of photographic film which would descend back down into Earth's atmosphere. Corona capsules were retrieved in mid-air as they floated down on parachutes. Later, spacecraft had digital imaging systems and downloaded the images via encrypted radio links.

In the United States, most information available about reconnaissance satellites is on programs that existed up to 1972, as this information has been declassified due to its age. Some information about programs before that time is still classified information, and a small amount of information is available on subsequent missions.

A few up-to-date reconnaissance satellite images have been declassified on occasion, or leaked, as in the case of KH-11 photographs which were sent to Jane's Defence Weekly in 1984.

History 
On 16 March 1955, the United States Air Force officially ordered the development of an advanced reconnaissance satellite to provide continuous surveillance of "preselected areas of the Earth" in order "to determine the status of a potential enemy’s war-making capability".

Types 
There are several major types of reconnaissance satellite.

Missile early warning

Provides warning of an attack by detecting ballistic missile launches. Earliest known are Missile Defense Alarm System.

Nuclear explosion detection
Detects nuclear detonation from space. Vela is the earliest known.

Electronic reconnaissance
Signals intelligence, intercepts stray radio waves. SOLRAD is the earliest known.

Optical imaging surveillance
Earth imaging satellites. Satellite images can be a survey or close-look telephoto. Corona is the earliest known. Spectral imaging is commonplace.

Radar imaging surveillance
Most space-based radars use synthetic-aperture radar. Can be used at night or through cloud cover. Earliest known are the Soviet US-A series.

Missions
Examples of reconnaissance satellite missions:
 High resolution photography (IMINT)
 Measurement and Signature Intelligence (MASINT)
 Communications eavesdropping (SIGINT)
 Covert communications
 Monitoring of nuclear test ban compliance (see National Technical Means)
 Detection of missile launches

On 28 August 2013, it was thought that "a $1-billion high-powered spy satellite capable of snapping pictures detailed enough to distinguish the make and model of an automobile hundreds of miles below" was launched from California's Vandenberg Air Force Base using a Delta IV Heavy launcher, America's highest-payload space launch vehicle at the time.

On 17 February 2014, a Russian Kosmos-1220 originally launched in 1980 and used for naval missile targeting until 1982, made an uncontrolled atmospheric entry.

Benefits
During the 1950s, a Soviet hoax had led to American fears of a bomber gap. In 1968, after gaining satellite photography, the United States' intelligence agencies were able to state with certainty that "No new ICBM complexes have been established in the USSR during the past year". President Lyndon B. Johnson told a gathering in 1967:

During his 1980 State of the Union Address, President Jimmy Carter explained how all of humanity benefited from the presence of American spy satellites:

Reconnaissance satellites have been used to enforce human rights, through the Satellite Sentinel Project, which monitors atrocities in Sudan and South Sudan.

Additionally, companies such as GeoEye and DigitalGlobe have provided commercial satellite imagery in support of natural disaster response and humanitarian missions.

In fiction
Spy satellites are commonly seen in spy fiction and military fiction. Some works of fiction that focus specifically on spy satellites include:
 The OMAC Project
 Enemy of the State
 Body of Lies
 Ice Station Zebra
 Parmanu: The Story of Pokhran
 Patriot Games

See also

 Aerial reconnaissance
 Defense Support Program (U.S.)
 European Union Satellite Centre
 List of intelligence gathering disciplines
 List of Kosmos satellites
 National Reconnaissance Office (U.S.)
 Satcom on the Move

References

Further reading

External links 
 FAS Intelligence Resource Program – Imagery Intelligence (IMINT)
 GlobalSecurity.org: Imagery Intelligence
 Iran to Launch first spy satellite 
 Egyptsat1 (MisrSat 1)
 Spaceports Around the World: Iraq's Al-Anbar Space Research Center
 Military Intelligence Satellites (NASA, remote sensing tutorial)

 
Espionage devices
Satellites by type
Earth observation satellites